Paharmura is a village in the Khowai district of Tripura state of India.

Details
According to the Census 201, the location code or village code of Paharmura is 271908. The village is 5 km away from sub-district headquarter Khowai and 85 km away from district headquarter Agartala.

The total area of Paharmura is 220 hectares. Paharmura has a total population of 2,761 peoples. There are about 648 houses in Paharmura village. Khowai is the nearest town to Paharmura, approximately 2 km away .

Schools in Paharmura 

 Paharmura Higher secondary school

References

Villages in Khowai district